Out of the Blue is a four-track extended play by Australian hard rock band, the Angels, released in October 1979. "Out of the Blue" peaked at number 29 on the Kent Music Report Singles Chart.

The title track had already appeared on the Angels' third album, No Exit in June 1979.

Track listing 
 "Out of the Blue" 3:17
 "Mr. Damage" 3:36
 "Save Me" 4:07
 "Am I Ever Gonna See Your Face Again" 3:41

Bonus tracks
 "Save Me" (Live at La Trobe University) 4:12 
 "Out of the Blue" (Live at La Trobe University) 3:56

Personnel 

 Doc Neeson – lead vocals
 Rick Brewster – lead guitar
 John Brewster – rhythm guitar
 Chris Bailey – bass guitar
 Graham "Buzz" Bidstrup – drums

Production
 Photography by – Desiree Field, Rod Birchill
 Producer – The Angels, Mark Opitz

Charts

References 

1979 EPs
The Angels (Australian band) albums
EPs by Australian artists
albums produced by Mark Opitz